South Lake is an unincorporated community in the Kern River Valley, in Kern County, California.

South Lake is located along the south shore of Lake Isabella. A CalTrans G9-2 guide sign posted along SR178 identifies the population as 160. The community uses the Weldon, California ZIP Code of 93283, and is contained within Area code 760.

History
According to the National Register for Historic Places, a Tübatulabal tribal settlement existed in this area circa 1499.

In 2016, the community was devastated by the 43,000-acre Erskine fire, which burned over 100 mobile home trailers and houses to the ground in a 1-square-mile area, killing two.

Geography
This populated place has a US Geological Survey (USGS), National Geographic Names Database feature ID of either 1867057 (current) or 1661474 (in older editions).

South Lake, California is located along SR178 between Bella Vista and Mountain Mesa. The community is in the South Fork portion of the Kern River Valley.

Kern County Fire Department, "South Lake" Station 71 is located at 9000 Navajo Ave. The station is identified as part of organizational unit "Battalion 7."

South of town, Goat Ranch Canyon extends into the Paiute Mountains.

See also
Weldon, California

References

Unincorporated communities in Kern County, California
Kern River Valley
Populated places in the Sierra Nevada (United States)
Unincorporated communities in California